Axel Scheffler (born ) is a German illustrator and animator based in London. He is best known for his cartoon-like pictures for children's books, in particular The Gruffalo and The Gruffalo's Child, written by Julia Donaldson. He has also authored/illustrated the Pip and Posy series of books for children.

Early life 
Scheffler was born on 12 December 1957 in Hamburg, West Germany. He began studying the History of Art at the University of Hamburg but dropped out, deciding instead to do alternative National Service, caring for the mentally ill. He moved to England in 1982, at the age of 25, to study Visual Communications at the Bath Academy of Art in Corsham, Wiltshire. The course also included an exchange to Cooper Union in New York. It was during these years (1982–1984) that Scheffler decided to become an illustrator.

Career 
Scheffler worked in advertising and publishing after graduating in 1985. During this time he lived at Streatham Hill in London and soon began children's illustrating. The first book he illustrated was The Piemakers by Helen Cresswell, in 1988. Since then, he has drawn his distinctive illustrations for authors of children's books from Britain, Germany and the Netherlands, including, in addition to Julia Donaldson, Jon Blake, Paul Shipton, David Henry Wilson, Uwe Timm, Paul van Loon and Toon Tellegen.

Scheffler was commissioned by Faber and Faber to provide new illustrations for a new edition of Old Possum's Book of Practical Cats that commemorated the 70th anniversary of the book and the 80th anniversary of the company, which was published in October 2009.

He illustrated Gordon Brown's 2006 Christmas cards and all seven Christmas 2012 stamps designed by Webb & Webb Design Limited for Royal Mail.

Personal life 
Scheffler lives in Richmond, London.

References

External links 

 Axel Scheffler's official website (https://axelscheffler.com)
  
Axel Scheffler, latest news, breaking stories and comment on The Independent
Axel Scheffler, latest news, breaking stories and comment on the Evening Standard
Axel Scheffler on the Financial Times

1957 births
Living people
Alumni of Bath School of Art and Design
Artists from Hamburg
Donaldson and Scheffler
German children's book illustrators
German contemporary artists
German expatriates in England
German illustrators
People from Hamburg
People from Richmond, London